Gennadi (birth name  Geniy) Gavrilovich Yukhtin (30 March 1932 – 18 February 2022) was a Russian film and stage actor.

Life and career
At the age of fourteen, Yukhtin was orphaned: his mother died at the front during the Second World War in 1942, and his father died of wounds in 1946. He ended up in a special orphanage for the children of dead army and navy officers. Later he ended up in the Volga region, where the teacher, a former actress, introduced her pupils to amateur art. Then Yukhtin became seriously interested in theatrical art. 

Yukhtin graduated from the All-Union State Institute of Cinematography. Since 1955, he has been an actor at the National Film Actors' Theatre. He appeared in more than 100 films between 1955 and 1991.

Death
Yukhtin tested positive for COVID-19 on 27 January 2022. He was hospitalized in critical condition on 11 February and died on 18 February 2022, at the age of 89.

Selected filmography
 Other People's Relatives (1956)
 Criminal Case of Rumyantsev (1956)
 Spring on Zarechnaya Street (1956)
 Ballad of a Soldier (1959)
 Zhavoronok (1964)
 The Hockey Players  (1964)
 The Elusive Avengers (1967)
 The Andromeda Nebula (1967)
 Dead Season (1968)
 The Brothers Karamazov (1969)
 This Merry Planet (1973)
 Siberiade (1979)
 Chernobyl: The Final Warning (1991)

Honors and awards
1976: Honored Artist of the RSFSR  
1994: People's Artist of Russia
2008: Order "For Merit to the Fatherland", 4th class

References

External links
 
  Gennadi Yukhtin Biography 

1932 births
2022 deaths
Deaths from the COVID-19 pandemic in Russia
Soviet male film actors
Soviet male television actors
Soviet male stage actors
Russian male film actors
Russian male television actors
Russian male stage actors
Honored Artists of the RSFSR
People's Artists of Russia
Recipients of the Order "For Merit to the Fatherland", 4th class
Gerasimov Institute of Cinematography alumni
Communist Party of the Soviet Union members
People from Samara Oblast